The Vanished Elephant is a 2014 internationally co-produced psycological thriller mystery film directed by Javier Fuentes-León.

Plot
A crime novelist is tormented by the very character he created.

Cast
 Salvador del Solar as Edo Celeste
 Angie Cepeda as Mara de Barclay
 Lucho Cáceres as Rafael Pineda
 Vanessa Saba as Celia Espinoza
 Andrés Parra as Ferrer
 Tatiana Astengo as Fiscal Sanchez

References

External links
 

2014 films
2014 psychological thriller films
Peruvian mystery films
2010s mystery films
Peruvian psychological thriller films
Colombian psychological thriller films
Spanish psychological thriller films
Spanish mystery thriller films
Tondero Producciones films
Films directed by Javier Fuentes-León
2010s Peruvian films
2010s Spanish-language films